is the first live album by Japanese singer Kyary Pamyu Pamyu, released on February 13, 2013. The DVD is of her largest show to date held at Nippon Budokan in Tokyo on November 6, 2012. The show's concept was of a pop-up picture book, and features many of Kyary's cute and colorful costumes with even a performance where she flies above the audience. All 20 songs performed are included.

It was released in DVD and Blu-ray editions. A limited edition (DVD only) comes with a bonus disc of a backstage documentary, bonus live footage from other shows, as well as videos of Kyary explaining how to dance "tsukematsukeru" and "Fashion Monster". The limited edition comes as a photo book package.

Track listing
The track listing is also the setlist as shown in order.

References

External links
 Official website

Kyary Pamyu Pamyu albums
Albums recorded at the Nippon Budokan
Albums produced by Yasutaka Nakata
Live J-pop albums
2013 live albums
Live electropop albums
Unborde albums